1969 saw humanity step onto another world for the first time. On 20th July 1969, the Apollo 11 Lunar Module, Eagle, landed on the Moon's surface with two astronauts aboard. Days later the crew of three returned safely to Earth, satisfying U.S. President John F. Kennedy's 1962 challenge of 25 May 1961, that "this nation should commit itself to achieving the goal, before this decade is out, of landing a man on the Moon and returning him safely to the Earth."

There were four Apollo missions in total in 1969, three of which traveled to the Moon, with Apollo 12 also landing on the surface. The success of the Apollo program was a testament to the efforts of over 500,000 American engineers, scientists and technicians.

In 1969, the Soviet Union's space program had success with the docking of two crewed spacecraft as well as the success of their Venus and Lunar probes. The Soviets, however, suffered severe blows to their crewed Lunar aspirations when their N1 rocket failed twice during two 1969 launches.

Orbital launches 

|colspan=8 style="background:white;"|

January 
|-

|colspan=8 style="background:white;"|

February 
|-

|colspan=8 style="background:white;"|

March 
|-

|colspan=8 style="background:white;"|

April 
|-

|colspan=8 style="background:white;"|

May 
|-

|colspan=8 style="background:white;"|

June 
|-

|colspan=8 style="background:white;"|

July 
|-

|colspan=8 style="background:white;"|

August 
|-

|colspan=8 style="background:white;"|

September 
|-

|colspan=8 style="background:white;"|

October 
|-

|colspan=8 style="background:white;"|

November 
|-

|colspan=8 style="background:white;"|

December 
|-

|}

Suborbital flights 

|}

Launches from the Moon 

|}

Deep-space rendezvous

Extravehicular activities (EVAs)

Orbital launch statistics

By country

By rocket

By family

By type

By configuration

By spaceport

By orbit

References

External links 

 
Spaceflight by year